Baris can refer to :

Places and jurisdictions 
 in Turkey
 Baris in Hellesponto, Ancient city and bishopric, now a Catholic titular see 
 Baris in Pisidia, Ancient Lydian city and Roman bishopric, now Isparta and a Catholic titular see

 elsewhere
 Baris, Egypt, an oasis in Egypt
 Hasmonean Baris, a citadel located in Jerusalem in Hasmonean times

Other 
 Baris (dance), a Balinese dance
 Baris (genus), a true weevil genus
 Baris (ship), an ancient Nile boat type
 Barış, a Turkish name meaning "Peace"
 Buzz Aldrin's Race into Space, a DOS computer game based on the race to put a man on the Moon